Yang Sen (born 25 March 1981) is a Taiwanese baseball player who has played for Uni-President Lions of the Chinese Professional Baseball League. He played second baseman for the Lions.

Personal life
He was married to a former member of Taiwan National Women's Football Team, they had a son named Yang Hao. They have since divorced. He is a descendant of the Pacidal clan of Amis tribe, a tribe of the Taiwanese Aborigines. The name Pacidal means the Sun in Amis language, and has the same meaning as Han family name Yang.

References

1981 births
2006 World Baseball Classic players
Living people
Amis people
People from Taitung County
Taiwanese baseball players
Uni-President 7-Eleven Lions players
Uni-President Lions players